Ethmia mnesicosma is a moth in the family Depressariidae. It is found from Mexico (both the east and west coast) to northern Venezuela and Trinidad. There is also a record from southern Brazil.

The ground color of the forewings is white, basally heavily spotted with shining gray or silver-blue on both the costal and dorsal areas. The ground color of the hindwings is whitish at the base, becoming brown towards the margins. Adults are on wing in February (in Trinidad), in May (in San Salvador and Yucatán), from June to July (in Veracruz), from July to August (in Sinoloa and Sonora), in November (in Venezuela) and in December (in Oaxaca).

The larvae feed on Cordia alliodora.

References

Moths described in 1924
mnesicosma